Axel Anderson (December 11, 1929 – December 16, 2012) was a German actor who was very popular in his adopted homeland of Puerto Rico.

Biography

Early life
Anderson was born Axel Levy to a Jewish family in Berlin, Germany. In 1936 Anderson's family escaped the Holocaust by emigrating to Paraguay. Due to political instability in Paraguay, Anderson's family soon moved to Argentina. Anderson started acting as a teenager, working at the Teatro Alemán Independiente, a small theater troupe mainly composed of German expatriates who performed in German.

During the 1950s, Anderson moved his young family to Bogotá, Colombia where he worked in theater. The family later moved to the Dominican Republic. During his time in the Dominican Republic, Anderson reportedly clashed with the politics of the Rafael Trujillo regime, being forced to emigrate one more time. He and his family settled in Puerto Rico where they have remained ever since.

Career
Anderson made his debut in Puerto Rican television with a sitcom named Qué Pareja, a local version of I Love Lucy. He also performed in theater and other short television productions. The actor quickly established himself as a leading man, landing several leading roles in local novelas or soap operas. Early in his career, he starred in a novela titled Cuando los hijos condenan in which Anderson and co-star Marta Romero shared the first on-screen kiss in the history of Puerto Rican television.

Anderson also starred in one of the first major motion pictures produced in Puerto Rico, Maruja. His film career continued with roles in Spanish and U.S. films, including Battle of the Bulge (1965) and Bananas (1971). He also participated in the Spanish dubs of several Hollywood films of the 1940s and 1950s as well as of many American TV shows.

In his last 20 years, Anderson remained one of the leading actors in Puerto Rico and continually acted in major local and international productions, including a small role as the bank director in the Sylvester Stallone thriller Assassins.

Anderson (lyrics) and Tony Croatto (music) co-wrote Agüeybaná, a song dedicated to the memory of the most important Taino "Cacique" of the pre-colonial Puerto Rico, recorded by Nelly y Tony and later by Haciendo Punto En Otro Son, which became a major hit in the 70s.

Anderson died on December 16, 2012, in San Juan, Puerto Rico.

Filmography

Recordings

OPUS 1
Martes 2 de la Tarde
Letra de Axel Anderson
Por Eso Que Llaman Amor
Emigrante
Ahora Sé
Inventario
El Pasado Ya Pasó
Para Elisa
Mis Cinco Sentidos
A Que No Sabes A Quien Ví
El Coro

See also

List of Puerto Ricans

References

External links
Axel Anderson Bio 

1929 births
2012 deaths
German emigrants to Puerto Rico
Deaths from cancer in Puerto Rico
Jewish American male actors
Jewish emigrants from Nazi Germany to the United States
Male actors from Berlin
Male actors from San Juan, Puerto Rico
Puerto Rican Jews
Puerto Rican male film actors
Puerto Rican male television actors
21st-century American Jews